Maharashtra General Kamgar Union, a trade union federation in Maharashtra, India. MGKU is formed by the well known Dutta Samant. After his assassination the union was then led by his elder brother Dada Samant. He handled the trade union for a few years but lacked leadership qualities so eventually he left leadership to the Union. The Union is now led by Bhushan Dutta Samant.

Trade unions in India
Trade unions in Maharashtra
Organizations with year of establishment missing